Jos van Eck (born 2 May 1963 in Rotterdam) is a Dutch retired footballer.

Playing career

Club
He previously played for De Graafschap, FC Zwolle, FC Den Bosch, Sparta Rotterdam, KFC Tielen vvrozenburg VV ROZENBURG and FC Dordrecht.

Managerial career
After retirement, he worked as an assistant coach, then manager at FC Dordrecht before Robert Verbeek took over in January 2004.  After leaving FC Dordrecht, he worked as an assistant coach at Sparta Rotterdam for 7 years before taking over as manager when Jan Everse resigned on 24 February 2011.  Jos continued as manager until the end of the season when Michel Vonk was appointed on a permanent basis. He later worked as a coach at amateur sides Quick Boys and Zwervers.

Personal life
His brother René played professional football in Holland and Switzerland.

References

1963 births
Living people
Footballers from Rotterdam
Association football defenders
Dutch footballers
De Graafschap players
PEC Zwolle players
FC Den Bosch players
Sparta Rotterdam players
FC Dordrecht players
Eredivisie players
Eerste Divisie players
Dutch expatriate footballers
Expatriate footballers in Belgium
Dutch expatriate sportspeople in Belgium
Dutch football managers
FC Dordrecht managers
Sparta Rotterdam managers